The Westerly Sun is a seven-day daily newspaper published in Westerly, Rhode Island, United States, covering portions of Washington County, Rhode Island, and New London County, Connecticut. The Sun is issued mornings 7 days a week.  Until 1995, it published its Sunday edition in the afternoon, and was the only such paper to do so at that time.

The Sun is the flagship publication of Sun Publishing Company, which also prints several free weekly newspapers in the area. Sun Publishing is itself a subsidiary of Southern RI Newspapers of Wakefield, RI.

Towns covered by The Sun include Charlestown, Hopkinton, Richmond, South Kingstown and Westerly, Rhode Island; and Groton, North Stonington and Stonington, Connecticut.

Prices
The Westerly Sun prices are: $1.00 daily, $2.00 Thursday and $2.50 Saturday/Sunday "Weekend Edition".

References

External links 
The Westerly Sun Website

Newspapers published in Rhode Island
Washington County, Rhode Island
Newspapers established in 1857
1857 establishments in Rhode Island